Asuaju de Sus  is a commune in Maramureș County, Crișana, Romania. It is composed of two villages, Asuaju de Jos (Alsószivágy) and Asuaju de Sus. The river Asuaj flows through this commune.

References

Communes in Maramureș County
Localities in Crișana